What Technology Wants is a 2010 nonfiction book by Kevin Kelly focused on technology as an extension of life.

Summary
The opening chapter of What Technology Wants, entitled "My Question", chronicles an early period in the author's life and conveys a sense of how he went from being a nomadic traveler with few possessions to a co-founder of Wired. The book invokes a giant force – the technium – which is "the greater, global, massively interconnected system of technology vibrating around us".

In November 2014, Kelly gave a SALT talk (Seminars About Long-term Thinking) for the Long Now Foundation titled "Technium Unbound", where he explained and expanded upon the ideas from his books What Technology Wants and Out of Control.

Criticism
Kelly's book has been criticized for espousing a teleological view of biological evolution that is rejected by some scientists, and for promoting a "bizarre neo-mystical progressivism" (by Jerry Coyne).

Editions
 Kevin Kelly. What Technology Wants. New York, Viking Press, October 14, 2010, hardcover, 416 pages. 
 Citia iOS iPad Edition, What Technology Wants, released May 2012 by Semi-Linear, Inc.

See also
 Out of Control
 Superorganism

References

External links
 What Technology Wants The Technium.
 Video: Kevin Kelly on what technology wants November 30, 2010, TEDx Amsterdam.

2010 non-fiction books
American non-fiction books
Penguin Books books
Technology books